Johann Schop (ca. 1590 – 1644) was a German violinist and composer, much admired as a musician and a technician, who was a virtuoso and whose compositions for the violin set impressive technical demands for that area at that time. In 1756 Leopold Mozart commented on the difficulty of a trill in a work by Schop, probably composed before 1646.

He worked in Hamburg. He published books of violin music in 4 to 6 parts; some of his music was performed at the Peace of Westphalia celebrations.

His melody Werde munter, mein Gemüte of 1641 was used by Johann Sebastian Bach for the chorale movements (6 and 10) of his cantata Herz und Mund und Tat und Leben, BWV 147. The sixth movement is Wohl mir, daß ich Jesum habe, and the tenth movement is Jesu bleibet meine Freude. Under the English title, Jesu, Joy of Man's Desiring, Bach's chorale has been arranged for different instruments, notably for piano by Myra Hess, and has gained wide popularity.

External links

References

Footnotes

Notations

1590s births
1667 deaths
17th-century classical composers
17th-century German people
German Baroque composers
German male classical composers
German Lutheran hymnwriters
17th-century male musicians